The 2018 Women's Junior European Volleyball Championship was the 26th edition of the competition, with the main phase (contested between 12 teams) held in Albania from 1 to 9 September 2018.

Participating teams
 Hosts
 
 Qualified through 2018 Women's U19 Volleyball European Championship Qualification

Preliminary round
All times are Central European Summer Time (UTC+02:00).

Pool I
venue: Dhimitrag Goga Sport Hall, Durrës

|}

|}

Pool II
venue: Olympic Park, Tirana

|}

|}

5th–8th classification
All times are Central European Summer Time (UTC+02:00).
venue: Dhimitrag Goga Sport Hall, Durrës

5th–8th semifinals

|}

7th place match

|}

5th place match

|}

Final round
All times are Central European Summer Time (UTC+02:00).
venue: Olympic Park, Tirana

Semifinals

|}

3rd place match

|}

Final

|}

Final standing

Awards

Most Valuable Player
  Valeria Battista 
Best Setter
  Polina Matveeva 
Best Outside Spikers
  Oliwia Bałuk 
  Derya Cebecioğlu 

Best Middle Blockers
  Viktoriia Pushina 
  Sarah Luisa Fahr 
Best Opposite Spiker
  Magdalena Stysiak 
Best Libero
  Sara Panetoni 

Source: CEV

See also
2018 Men's U20 Volleyball European Championship

References

External links
European Championship U19 - Women 2018 (Europe): Results @scores pro

Women's Junior European Volleyball Championship
Europe
2018 in Albanian sport
International sports competitions hosted by Albania
Volleyball European Championship (Women's U19)